Alan Graeme Auld (born 14 August 1941) is a British Old Testament scholar. He is Professor of Hebrew Bible at the University of Edinburgh.

Auld was born in Aberdeen and studied at Robert Gordon's College, the University of Aberdeen, and the University of Edinburgh.  He was awarded a PhD from the University of Edinburgh in 1976 for his thesis on 'Studies in Joshua: Text and Literary Relations'.  Auld has written commentaries on Joshua, Judges and Ruth, 1 and 2 Samuel, and 1 and 2 Kings. He served as president of the Society for Old Testament Study in 2005.

In 2007, a Festschrift was published in his honour. Reflection and Refraction: Studies in Biblical Historiography in Honour of A. Graeme Auld included contributions from John Barton, Ronald E. Clements, David J. A. Clines, Gary N. Knoppers, Emanuel Tov, John Van Seters, and Hugh G. M. Williamson.

Bibliography

References

1941 births
Living people
British biblical scholars
Old Testament scholars
Bible commentators
Academics of the University of Edinburgh
People educated at Robert Gordon's College
Alumni of the University of Aberdeen
Alumni of the University of Edinburgh School of Divinity
People from Aberdeen
Presidents of the Society for Old Testament Study